The following lists events that happened during 1924 in Chile.

Incumbents
President of Chile: Arturo Alessandri (until September 11), Luis Altamirano

Events

September
3 September – The Saber noise occurs. 
11 September – The Government Junta of Chile (1924) is created after a military coup.

Undated

Births 
1 January – Klaus Junge (d. 1945)
1 March – Mercedes Valdivieso (d. 1993)
7 April – Daniel Emilfork (d. 2006)
724 April – Vicente Sota, politician (d. 2017)
20 September – Exequiel Ramírez (d. 2000)

Deaths 
19 December – Luis Emilio Recabarren (b. 1876)

References 

 
Years of the 20th century in Chile
Chile